Chaudhary Karnail Singh is a 1960 Indian Punjabi movie based in the pre-partition times of India.  The film was one of the earliest works of Prem Chopra.  The film won a National Award.

Cast
Jagdish Sethi as Chaudhary Karnail Singh 
Prem Chopra as  Shera 
Madan Puri as  Boota Singh

References

External links 
 

1960 films
Punjabi-language Indian films
1960s Punjabi-language films